Bianca is a fictional character in William Shakespeare's Othello (c. 1601–1604).  She is Cassio's jealous lover. Despite her brief appearance on stage, Bianca plays a significant role in the progress of Iago's scheme to make Othello believe that his wife Desdemona is cheating on him with Cassio.  Bianca is traditionally regarded as a courtesan, although this occupation is not specifically designated in the drama. The character was occasionally cut from performances in the 19th century on moral grounds. Bianca is not to be confused with Bianca Minola in Shakespeare's The Taming of the Shrew.

Sources 
Othello has its source in the 1565 tale "Un Capitano Moro" from Gli Hecatommithi by Giovanni Battista Giraldi Cinthio.  While no English translation of Cinthio was available in Shakespeare's lifetime, it is probable that Shakespeare knew both the Italian original and Gabriel Chappuy's 1584 French translation.  Cinthio's tale may have been based on an actual incident occurring in Venice about 1508.

Bianca is based upon a character in Cinthio's tale who, apparently of her own volition, copies the work in the handkerchief after finding it in the Cassio counterpart's house. While the woman sits with the handkerchief at a window, the ensign makes certain the Moor sees her with it. The Moor then believes he is confirmed in his suspicions of Desdemona's adultery. It is unclear if Cinthio's character is a courtesan, wife, or other.

Role in Othello 

In Act 3, Scene 3, Iago reveals to the audience that, having surreptitiously obtained the handkerchief that Othello had originally given Desdemona as a lover's token, he will lose it in Cassio's lodging. Upon discovering the handkerchief in the following scene, Cassio admires its craftsmanship and asks Bianca to copy it for him. Bianca, already furious with Cassio for his apparent disregard of their relationship, suggests that the handkerchief is a gift from another woman, but eventually agrees to his request.

Midway through Act 4, Scene 1, and prior to Bianca's entrance, Othello has been secretly observing a bawdy discussion between Iago and Cassio about the latter's sexual exploits with a young woman. Thanks to Iago's impeccable planning (and some bad luck), neither speaker mentions the name of the woman in question; it is in fact Bianca, but Othello tragically assumes it to be his wife, Desdemona. Bianca suddenly enters, and her suspicions of Cassio are even greater than before. She is convinced that the handkerchief belongs to another woman, and throws it contemptuously at Cassio's feet. In Othello's eyes, her apparent jealousy confirms his wife's infidelity. This "evidence" completes Iago's manufactured case against Desdemona, and thereafter Othello is determined to murder both her and Cassio.

In Act 5, Scene 1, Bianca arrives just after Cassio has been stabbed by Iago.  She reacts with horror and concern.  Iago, pretending to have just entered the scene, accuses Bianca of having been part of the group that attacked Cassio.  Iago claims her emotional reaction is due to her being caught rather than concern for Cassio and gets her to admit that Cassio ate at her home earlier that evening.  Both Iago and Emilia call her a prostitute, but Bianca replies "I am no strumpet; but of life as honest / as you that doth abuse me" (5.1.122-3).  She is led off at the end of the scene to be questioned about the attack and is not mentioned again in the play.

In film and television 
In film, Doris Dowling played the character in Orson Welles's troubled but critically acclaimed 1952 adaptation. In 1965, Sheila Reid portrayed Bianca in Laurence Olivier's 1965 version, and Indra Ové played the character in the 1995 feature film starring Laurence Fishburne.  Bianca was renamed "Brandy" and played by Rachel Shumate in O, a retelling of the story set in a contemporary high school. In the 2006 Hindi film adaptation Omkara, the character was renamed "Billo Chamanbahar" and played by Bipasha Basu. In this variation, the Bianca character is not given a handkerchief, but a jewelled belt called a kamarbandh.

On television, Betsy Blair played the character in a 1955 BBC adaptation with Gordon Heath as Othello and Rosemary Harris as Desdemona.  Wendy Morgan played Bianca in 1981 in the critically acclaimed BBC complete Shakespeare series.  The character was renamed "Lulu" and played by Rachael Stirling in an award winning modern English telemovie first broadcast on ITV on 23 December 2001.

References 

Literary characters introduced in 1603
Female Shakespearean characters
Fictional courtesans
Fictional Italian people in literature
Othello